Bill Auberlen (born October 12, 1968) is an American factory race car driver known for his affiliation with BMW, driving cars made and run by the famous German marque for a number of years. Auberlen currently competes for Turner Motorsport in the IMSA SportsCar Championship and Michelin Pilot Challenge. He is the winningest driver in IMSA history.

Motorsports career and affiliation with BMW
Auberlen was born in Redondo Beach, California, located in the Los Angeles metropolitan area and attended Rolling Hills High School. His career started in the 1970s in motocross, with Auberlen moving to IMSA GTU in 1987. He stayed there until 1997, his last year resulting in him winning the championship. During his time in the IMSA Series he had also become the 1996 Peruvian Formula Three champion and took part in several Formula Atlantic races.

Auberlen mentioned in a 2020 edition of the Marshall Pruett Podcast that he was in advanced negotiations with Hogan Racing for a drive in the 1998 CART series but chose to pursue an opportunity with BMW instead.

Other competitions Auberlen has competed in during his career include the 24 Hours of Le Mans and the American Le Mans Series (1999-2003), driving a BMW V12 LMR in 1999 and 2000 for Schnitzer Motorsport. During the Petit Le Mans at Road Atlanta in 2000, his BMW did a spectacular back flip over the same hump over which Yannick Dalmas backflipped in a Porsche 911 GT1 in 1998.

Auberlen briefly stepped up to Grand-Am's Daytona Prototype class in 2003, in addition to driving a BMW 325i for Turner Motorsport in World Challenge touring. Auberlen won both the 2003 and 2004 Speed World Challenge Touring Car Championship behind the wheel of a Turner Motorsport BMW 325i. By doing so, Auberlen ended an eight-year Honda / Acura domination of the series.

For 2004, Auberlen dedicated himself to the production-based World Challenge GT class for BMW Motorsport's Prototype Technology Group team, earning the series championship for BMW.

In 2005, Auberlen continued to drive for BMW PTG in Grand-Am's GT series, while also driving for Panoz Racing in IMSA's American Le Mans Series.

In 2006, Auberlen once again exclusively drove BMWs — an M3 for Sigalsport's Grand-Am GT team, an M3 for Turner's Grand-Am team and an M3 for BMW PTG's ALMS team.

It is believed that Bill Auberlen has driven BMW cars in more races than any other driver in the world. He has won six professional auto-racing championships, four with BMW power. He has competed in over 500 professional races to date, 339 in BMWs. His results include 91 race victories, 188 podium finishes, 56 pole positions, 83 fastest race laps and 110 records.

For four seasons (2014-2017), Auberlen drove full-time for Rahal Letterman Lanigan Racing in the IMSA GTLM class of the WeatherTech SportsCar Championship; first in a BMW Z4 GTE then BMW M6 GTLM. In November 2017, Auberlen was named a BMW Brand Ambassador, but stepped down as a full-time driver in GTLM for 2018. He continued to compete part-time for RLLR in the endurance races, while driving for Turner Motorsports in the IMSA GTD class in shorter events, driving a BMW M6 GT3.

In 2019, Auberlen returned to full-time competition for BMW, partnering with Robby Foley in the Turner BMW #96 in the GTD class.

Personal life
In addition to his racing success, Auberlen has designed and built fast boats and bikes. Using motorsport technology, he developed X Power Drive, a high-performance boating outdrive, engineered a custom 1554-hp Chevrolet engine that powered his open-bow Carrera catamaran to numerous world speed and acceleration records. He also built a custom turbocharged 420 hp motorcycle.

Career highlights
1987-94 IMSA GTU – eight poles (five record), five wins including pole and win in East-West Challenge 1993 (Fuji, Japan) and 1994 (Autopolis, Japan), 16 podiums including second in 12 Hours of Sebring 1987 and 24 Hours of Daytona 1988, three fastest race laps (one record); co-drove  with father Gary 1987 to 1989.

1995 IMSA GTS-2 – second, record seven-consecutive record poles, five wins including 12 Hours of Sebring on 10th anniversary of father Gary's Sebring win, eight podiums and seven record fastest race laps in 11 races; Speedvision Cup – two wins, three podiums, two record fastest race laps; Atlantic Championship – second in series debut, record fastest race lap.

1996 Bill joined BMW Team PTG after his very successful privateer effort. He became the 1996 Peruvian Formula Three champion – four wins, five podiums; IMSA GTS-2 – one record pole, three podiums, one fastest race lap; competed in all three classes at the 12 Hours of Sebring; first WSC start, in Rolex 24 At Daytona

In 1997, Bill was the IMSA GTS-3 champion – six poles (three record), five wins including Rolex 24 At Daytona and 12 Hours of Sebring, eight podiums, three fastest race laps (two record); three WSC starts; Speedvision Cup – one record pole, two podiums; Atlantic Championship podium.

1998 fourth, 24 Heures du Mans GT1; test driver, BMW V8 race engine development; SPORTS CAR – first BMW prototype victory; SPORTS CAR and USRRC GT2 and GT3 – six record poles, seven wins including Rolex 24 At Daytona and 12 Hours of Sebring, two class wins in same race, nine podiums, seven fastest race laps (six record); International Sports Racing Series – two podiums; Won the final IMSA GT Championship race overall at Laguna Seca Raceway

1999 fifth, 24 Heures du Mans Prototype; American Le Mans Series Prototype – three podiums; USRRC GT3 – one record fastest race lap

2000 American Le Mans Series Prototype –  two podiums; Grand American Road Racing Association GTU – two wins, two record fastest race laps

2001 American Le Mans Series GT – Petit Le Mans win, one record fastest race lap; Rolex Sports Car Series GT – one overall and GT podium, one record fastest race lap; World Challenge TC – one pole, record 43-place last-to-first victory at Lime Rock Park, one fastest race lap

2002 Rolex Sports Car Series GT co-champion – two poles (one record), five wins, seven podiums, one record fastest race lap; 24 Heures du Mans LMP 900; American Le Mans Series LMP 900 – one podium; Grand-Am Cup GS1 – one podium, one record fastest race lap

2003 World Challenge TC champion – three poles (two record), four wins including three flag-to-flag, record eight podiums, seven fastest race laps (five record), two record race speeds; World Challenge GT – second, four poles (three record), three wins, one flag-to-flag and one last-to-first at Lime Rock Park in heavy rain, four podiums, four fastest race laps (three record), one record race speed; Rolex Sports Car Series DP – one record pole, two podiums, one record fastest race lap; American Le Mans Series LMP 900 – one podium

2003 Grassroots Motorsports Editors' Choice Award.

2004 Rolex Sports Car Series GT champion – five record poles, record eight wins including record six consecutive wins, nine podiums, six fastest race laps (three record), career GT victory record; World Challenge TC champion – three record poles, three wins, five podiums, two record fastest race laps, one record race speed, record career winning percentage; Grand-Am Cup ST – one win; selected as All-American Team member, American Auto Racing Writers and Broadcasters Association

2005 24 Heures du Mans GT2 – qualified third; American Le Mans Series GT – one record pole, one win, two podiums; Rolex Sports Car Series GT – three poles (one record), three wins, five podiums, three fastest race laps (two record); Grand-Am Cup GS – five wins, six podiums, one record fastest race lap; World Challenge TC – one pole, two wins, three podiums, two fastest race laps (one record), one record race speed, series record fifth career win at Lime Rock Park

2006 American Le Mans Series GT2 – three podiums; Rolex Sports Car Series – one DP podium, one GT record fastest race lap; Grand-Am Cup GS – third, two wins, five podiums, two fastest race laps (one record); World Challenge TC – one record pole, one win, one record fastest race lap

2007 American Le Mans Series GT2 – one podium; Rolex Sports Car Series DP – one win; KONI Challenge Series GS – three wins, five podiums, two fastest race laps (one record)

2008 Rolex Sports Car Series DP – two podiums; KONI Sports Car Challenge GS – one pole, one win, four podiums, four fastest race laps

2009 American Le Mans Series GT2 - one win, two podiums; KONI Sports Car Challenge GS – one win, four podiums, one fastest race lap

2010 American Le Mans Series GT – team champion, third in driver points, six podiums including 12 Hours of Sebring; Rolex Sports Car Series GT – one win, two podiums, two fastest race laps(one record); Continental Tire Sports Car Challenge GS – one fastest race lap

2011 American Le Mans Series GT – five podiums, including second, 12 Hours of Sebring; 24H Dubai – fifth, third-fastest race lap; Rolex Sports Car Series GT – two wins, four podiums, one fastest race lap; Continental Tire Sports Car Challenge GS – one win, five podiums, two fastest race laps (one record)

2012 American Le Mans Series GT – one record pole, one win, four podiums, one record fastest race lap; Rolex Sports Car Series GT – two wins, four podiums, two fastest race laps (one record)

2020 WeatherTech Sports Car Championship GTD – 61st career win, surpassing Scott Pruett for most in IMSA history.

Racing record

24 Hours of Daytona results

24 Hours of Le Mans results

WeatherTech SportsCar Championship results
(key) (Races in bold indicate pole position; results in italics indicate fastest lap)

Complete FIA World Endurance Championship results
(key) (Races in bold indicate pole position) (Races in italics indicate fastest lap)

External links

 Grand-Am driver profile
 Bio and career highlights (Rahal Letterman Racing)
 Profile on TheRaceSite.com

1968 births
24 Hours of Daytona drivers
24 Hours of Le Mans drivers
American Le Mans Series drivers
Atlantic Championship drivers
Rolex Sports Car Series drivers
Living people
Sportspeople from Redondo Beach, California
Racing drivers from California
FIA World Endurance Championship drivers
WeatherTech SportsCar Championship drivers
24H Series drivers
GT World Challenge America drivers
Aston Martin Racing drivers
Rahal Letterman Lanigan Racing drivers
BMW M drivers
David Price Racing drivers
Schnitzer Motorsport drivers
Michelin Pilot Challenge drivers